Molybdenum (42Mo) has 33 known isotopes, ranging in atomic mass from 83 to 115, as well as four metastable nuclear isomers. Seven isotopes occur naturally, with atomic masses of 92, 94, 95, 96, 97, 98, and 100. All unstable isotopes of molybdenum decay into isotopes of zirconium, niobium, technetium, and ruthenium.

Molybdenum-100 is the only naturally occurring isotope that is not stable. Molybdenum-100 has a half-life of approximately 1×1019 y and undergoes double beta decay into ruthenium-100. Molybdenum-98 is the most common isotope, comprising 24.14% of all molybdenum on Earth. Molybdenum isotopes with mass numbers 111 and up all have half-lives of approximately .15 s.

List of isotopes 

|-
| rowspan=2|83Mo
| rowspan=2 style="text-align:right" | 42
| rowspan=2 style="text-align:right" | 41
| rowspan=2|82.94874(54)#
| rowspan=2|23(19) ms[6(+30-3) ms]
| β+
| 83Nb
| rowspan=2|3/2−#
| rowspan=2|
| rowspan=2|
|-
| β+, p
| 82Zr
|-
| 84Mo
| style="text-align:right" | 42
| style="text-align:right" | 42
| 83.94009(43)#
| 3.8(9) ms[3.7(+10-8) s]
| β+
| 84Nb
| 0+
|
|
|-
| 85Mo
| style="text-align:right" | 42
| style="text-align:right" | 43
| 84.93655(30)#
| 3.2(2) s
| β+
| 85Nb
| (1/2−)#
|
|
|-
| 86Mo
| style="text-align:right" | 42
| style="text-align:right" | 44
| 85.93070(47)
| 19.6(11) s
| β+
| 86Nb
| 0+
|
|
|-
| rowspan=2|87Mo
| rowspan=2 style="text-align:right" | 42
| rowspan=2 style="text-align:right" | 45
| rowspan=2|86.92733(24)
| rowspan=2|14.05(23) s
| β+ (85%)
| 87Nb
| rowspan=2|7/2+#
| rowspan=2|
| rowspan=2|
|-
| β+, p (15%)
| 86Zr
|-
| 88Mo
| style="text-align:right" | 42
| style="text-align:right" | 46
| 87.921953(22)
| 8.0(2) min
| β+
| 88Nb
| 0+
|
|
|-
| 89Mo
| style="text-align:right" | 42
| style="text-align:right" | 47
| 88.919480(17)
| 2.11(10) min
| β+
| 89Nb
| (9/2+)
|
|
|-
| style="text-indent:1em" | 89mMo
| colspan="3" style="text-indent:2em" | 387.5(2) keV
| 190(15) ms
| IT
| 89Mo
| (1/2−)
|
|
|-
| 90Mo
| style="text-align:right" | 42
| style="text-align:right" | 48
| 89.913937(7)
| 5.56(9) h
| β+
| 90Nb
| 0+
|
|
|-
| style="text-indent:1em" | 90mMo
| colspan="3" style="text-indent:2em" | 2874.73(15) keV
| 1.12(5) μs
|
|
| 8+#
|
|
|-
| 91Mo
| style="text-align:right" | 42
| style="text-align:right" | 49
| 90.911750(12)
| 15.49(1) min
| β+
| 91Nb
| 9/2+
|
|
|-
| rowspan=2 style="text-indent:1em" | 91mMo
| rowspan=2 colspan="3" style="text-indent:2em" | 653.01(9) keV
| rowspan=2|64.6(6) s
| IT (50.1%)
| 91Mo
| rowspan=2|1/2−
| rowspan=2|
| rowspan=2|
|-
| β+ (49.9%)
| 91Nb
|-
| 92Mo
| style="text-align:right" | 42
| style="text-align:right" | 50
| 91.906811(4)
| colspan=3 align=center|Observationally Stable
| 0+
|  0.14649(106)
|
|-
| style="text-indent:1em" | 92mMo
| colspan="3" style="text-indent:2em" | 2760.46(16) keV
| 190(3) ns
|
|
| 8+
|
|
|-
| 93Mo
| style="text-align:right" | 42
| style="text-align:right" | 51
| 92.906813(4)
| 4,000(800) y
| EC
| 93Nb
| 5/2+
|
|
|-
| rowspan=2 style="text-indent:1em" | 93mMo
| rowspan=2 colspan="3" style="text-indent:2em" | 2424.89(3) keV
| rowspan=2|6.85(7) h
| IT (99.88%)
| 93Mo
| rowspan=2|21/2+
| rowspan=2|
| rowspan=2|
|-
| β+ (.12%)
| 93Nb
|-
| 94Mo
| style="text-align:right" | 42
| style="text-align:right" | 52
| 93.9050883(21)
| colspan=3 align=center|Stable
| 0+
|  0.09187(33)
|
|-
| 95Mo
| style="text-align:right" | 42
| style="text-align:right" | 53
| 94.9058421(21)
| colspan=3 align=center|Stable
| 5/2+
| 0.15873(30)
|
|-
| 96Mo
| style="text-align:right" | 42
| style="text-align:right" | 54
| 95.9046795(21)
| colspan=3 align=center|Stable
| 0+
| 0.16673(30)
|
|-
| 97Mo
| style="text-align:right" | 42
| style="text-align:right" | 55
| 96.9060215(21)
| colspan=3 align=center|Stable
| 5/2+
| 0.09582(15)
|
|-
| 98Mo
| style="text-align:right" | 42
| style="text-align:right" | 56
| 97.90540482(21)
| colspan=3 align=center|Observationally Stable
| 0+
| 0.24292(80)
|
|-
| 99Mo
| style="text-align:right" | 42
| style="text-align:right" | 57
| 98.9077119(21)
| 2.7489(6) d
| β−
| 99mTc
| 1/2+
|
|
|-
| style="text-indent:1em" | 99m1Mo
| colspan="3" style="text-indent:2em" | 97.785(3) keV
| 15.5(2) μs
|
|
| 5/2+
|
|
|-
| style="text-indent:1em" | 99m2Mo
| colspan="3" style="text-indent:2em" | 684.5(4) keV
| 0.76(6) μs
|
|
| 11/2−
|
|
|-
| 100Mo
| style="text-align:right" | 42
| style="text-align:right" | 58
| 99.907477(6)
| 8.5(5)×1018 a
| β−β−
| 100Ru
| 0+
| 0.09744(65)
|
|-
| 101Mo
| style="text-align:right" | 42
| style="text-align:right" | 59
| 100.910347(6)
| 14.61(3) min
| β−
| 101Tc
| 1/2+
|
|
|-
| 102Mo
| style="text-align:right" | 42
| style="text-align:right" | 60
| 101.910297(22)
| 11.3(2) min
| β−
| 102Tc
| 0+
|
|
|-
| 103Mo
| style="text-align:right" | 42
| style="text-align:right" | 61
| 102.91321(7)
| 67.5(15) s
| β−
| 103Tc
| (3/2+)
|
|
|-
| 104Mo
| style="text-align:right" | 42
| style="text-align:right" | 62
| 103.91376(6)
| 60(2) s
| β−
| 104Tc
| 0+
|
|
|-
| 105Mo
| style="text-align:right" | 42
| style="text-align:right" | 63
| 104.91697(8)
| 35.6(16) s
| β−
| 105Tc
| (5/2−)
|
|
|-
| 106Mo
| style="text-align:right" | 42
| style="text-align:right" | 64
| 105.918137(19)
| 8.73(12) s
| β−
| 106Tc
| 0+
|
|
|-
| 107Mo
| style="text-align:right" | 42
| style="text-align:right" | 65
| 106.92169(17)
| 3.5(5) s
| β−
| 107Tc
| (7/2−)
|
|
|-
| style="text-indent:1em" | 107mMo
| colspan="3" style="text-indent:2em" | 66.3(2) keV
| 470(30) ns
|
|
| (5/2−)
|
|
|-
| 108Mo
| style="text-align:right" | 42
| style="text-align:right" | 66
| 107.92345(21)#
| 1.09(2) s
| β−
| 108Tc
| 0+
|
|
|-
| 109Mo
| style="text-align:right" | 42
| style="text-align:right" | 67
| 108.92781(32)#
| 0.53(6) s
| β−
| 109Tc
| (7/2−)#
|
|
|-
| rowspan=2|110Mo
| rowspan=2 style="text-align:right" | 42
| rowspan=2 style="text-align:right" | 68
| rowspan=2|109.92973(43)#
| rowspan=2|0.27(1) s
| β− (>99.9%)
| 110Tc
| rowspan=2|0+
| rowspan=2|
| rowspan=2|
|-
| β−, n (<.1%)
| 109Tc
|-
| 111Mo
| style="text-align:right" | 42
| style="text-align:right" | 69
| 110.93441(43)#
| 200# ms[>300 ns]
| β−
| 111Tc
|
|
|
|-
| 112Mo
| style="text-align:right" | 42
| style="text-align:right" | 70
| 111.93684(64)#
| 150# ms[>300 ns]
| β−
| 112Tc
| 0+
|
|
|-
| 113Mo
| style="text-align:right" | 42
| style="text-align:right" | 71
| 112.94188(64)#
| 100# ms[>300 ns]
| β−
| 113Tc
|
|
|
|-
| 114Mo
| style="text-align:right" | 42
| style="text-align:right" | 72
| 113.94492(75)#
| 80# ms[>300 ns]
|
|
| 0+
|
|
|-
| 115Mo
| style="text-align:right" | 42
| style="text-align:right" | 73
| 114.95029(86)#
| 60# ms[>300 ns]
|
|
|
|
|

Molybdenum-99 
Molybdenum-99 is produced commercially by intense neutron-bombardment of a highly purified uranium-235 target, followed rapidly by extraction. It is used as a parent radioisotope in technetium-99m generators to produce the even shorter-lived daughter isotope technetium-99m, which is used in approximately 40 million medical procedures annually. A common misunderstanding or misnomer is that 99Mo is used in these diagnostic medical scans, when actually it has no role in the imaging agent or the scan itself.  In fact, 99Mo co-eluted with the 99mTc (also known as breakthrough) is considered a contaminant and is minimised to adhere to the appropriate USP (or equivalent) regulations and standards. The IAEA recommends that 99Mo concentrations exceeding more than 0.15 µCi/mCi 99mTc or 0.015% should not be administered for usage in humans. Typically, quantification of 99Mo breakthrough is performed for every elution when using a 99Mo/99mTc generator during QA-QC testing of the final product.

There are alternative routes for generating 99Mo that do not require a fissionable target, such as high or low enriched uranium (i.e., HEU or LEU). Some of these include accelerator-based methods, such as proton bombardment or photoneutron reactions on enriched 100Mo targets. Historically, 99Mo generated by neutron capture on natural isotopic molybdenum or enriched 98Mo targets was used for the development of commercial 99Mo/99mTc generators.  The neutron-capture process was eventually superseded by fission-based 99Mo that could be generated with much higher specific activities. Implementing feed-stocks of high specific activity 99Mo solutions thus allowed for higher quality production and better separations of 99mTc  from 99Mo on small alumina column using chromatography. Employing low-specific activity 99Mo under similar conditions is particularly problematic in that either higher Mo loading capacities or larger columns are required for accommodating equivalent amounts of 99Mo. Chemically speaking, this phenomenon occurs due to other Mo isotopes present aside from 99Mo that compete for surface site interactions on the column substrate. In turn, low-specific activity 99Mo usually requires much larger column sizes and longer separation times, and usually yields 99mTc accompanied by unsatisfactory amounts of the parent radioisotope when using γ-alumina as the column substrate. Ultimately, the inferior end-product 99mTc generated under these conditions makes it essentially incompatible with the commercial supply-chain.

In the last decade, cooperative agreements between the US government and private capital entities have resurrected neutron capture production for commercially distributed 99Mo/99mTc in the United States of America. The return to neutron-capture-based 99Mo has also been accompanied by the implementation of novel separation methods that allow for low-specific activity 99Mo to be utilized.

References

 Isotope masses from:

 Isotopic compositions and standard atomic masses from:

 Half-life, spin, and isomer data selected from the following sources.

 
Molybdenum
Molybdenum